The 1953–54 DFB-Pokal was the 11th season of the annual German football cup competition. 8 teams competed in the tournament of three rounds. It began on 1 August 1953 and ended on 17 April 1954. In the final VfB Stuttgart defeated FC Köln 1–0 after extra time.

Matches

Quarter-finals

Replay

Semi-finals

Replay

Final

References

External links
 Official site of the DFB 
 Kicker.de 
 1953–54 results at Fussballdaten.de 

1953-54
1953–54 in German football cups